Nuestra Belleza Latina 2015 (also known as NBL 2015) is the ninth season of Nuestra Belleza Latina and the ninth season to be aired on Univision. The season premiere was on Sunday January 18, 2015, the earliest premiere of all nine seasons. The season finale was on Sunday April 12, 2015, the earliest finale of all nine seasons.

The auditions were shown on three Sundays, prior to the selection of the final 12 contestants. Auditions were held September 2014 through November 2014 in six US cities (Miami, Florida; Chicago, Illinois; New York City, New York; Houston, Texas; Los Angeles, and San Juan, Puerto Rico) and virtual online casting. This was the first time since 2013 to show the contestants' castings, and in the previous two seasons only the final 36 and 24 were shown. During the audition process, 35 young women were given passes to the semi-finals in Miami and the remaining 5 were chosen from the online casting. The forty women were asked questions by the judges, then the chosen top twenty contestants did a talent presentation on stage, from which the 12 finalists were selected.

The winner of the contest was awarded a contract to appear on many of Univision's programs and award shows, and a chance to win $200,000 in cash and prizes including a 2015 Kia Soul: the same amount of prizes awarded in previous seasons. She will also be a host for ¡Despierta América!, a correspondent for Premios Juventud 2015, and awarded the title of "Nuestra Belleza Latina" for 2015. The runner-up contestant was awarded a contract to appear as a news correspondent for El Gordo y La Flaca and award shows.

The winner of Nuestra Belleza Latina 2015 is Francisca Lachapel from the Dominican Republic.

2015 Judges

Changes 
For the first time since Nuestra Belleza Latina 2012 the casting process was shown prior to the first gala. Judge of seven seasons former Miss Universe 1991 Lupita Jones will not return to judge the competition, Jones had been judge since Nuestra Belleza Latina 2008. Added to the Judging panel will be former Nuestra Belleza Mexico 2000 and actress Jaqueline Bracamontes.Season 8 Judge Jencarlos Canela left the show to pursue his acting career and other projects and will no longer judge the show. Both new host, former Nuestra Belleza Latina 2007 winner Alejandra Espinoza and model/actor Pedro Moreno have left the show to pursue new projects. New male co-host of Chiquinquira Delgado will be Mexican Host Javier Poza who she shared credits in Mira Quien Baila (2010-2013). Jomari Goyso becomes permanent judge after being only a  guest judge and official beauty consultant of the contestants for Nuestra Belleza Latina 2014. Both former Miss Universe winners Alicia Machado and Denise Quiñones who served as "Godmothers" for the contestants in Nuestra Belleza Latina 2014 did not return this season. A new segment called "Rincon Social" has been added with host Roger Gonzalez, who will interview the guest, contestants and present on what social media is saying. Nuestra Belleza Latina 2014 Winner Aleyda Ortiz alongside former Nuestra Belleza Latina 2011 winner Nastassja Bolívar will be the social media co-hostess throughout the competition. For the first time since Season One in 2007 the stage has been renovated, with a different look.

2015 Contestants

Elimination chart

2015 auditions

Celebrity guest appearances

Countries being represented 

 Eliminated
 First Place
 Winner
 Runner-Up
 CPW: Countries Previously won
 : Countries Previously won

Episodes

Season 9, Episode 1: A New Season Starts
Original Air Date—18 January 2015

The best of the auditions held in Chicago, Puerto Rico, and Los Angeles.

The Guest Judges were:

The following contestants were chosen:

Season 9, Episode 2: The Auditions Continue
Original Air Date—25 January 2015
The last of Los Angeles and best of the auditions held in Houston, Miami and New York.

The guest judges were:

The following contestants were chosen:

Online Casting

Season 9, Episode 3: The Top 12 are Chosen
Original Air Date—1 February 2015

The 40 contestants chosen in casting, including the 5 chosen from the online casting, competed for the 12 spots into the competition. The 12 contestants selected are announced.

The Top 12:

Season 9, Episode 4: Fifty Shades of Cat Fights and Zombies
Original Air Date—8 February 2015

The Top 12 contestants chosen move into the mansion where they face their first challenge, two girls are nominated. They face two challenges which include explosions, zombies, and heroines.
Six were asked to perform a photo shoot inspired by the film 50 Shades of Grey. Maluma asked the girls to dance to his new single, 'Carnaval' and Miss Universe 2014, Paulina Vega, advised the girls.

Automatically Nominated: Lisandra Silva, Catherine Castro and Nathalia Casco
Nominated by Judges: Anayeli De Santiago
Saved by Judges: Lisandra Silva
Saved by Fellow Contestants: Catherine Castro 
Nominees of the Week: Nathalia Casco and Anayeli De Santiago
First Call-Out (At the Final Runway): Mariana Torres
Challenge Winners: Lisandra Silva, Gloricely Loug, Clarissa Molina, Geisha Montes De Oca, Nadyalee Torres, Bridget Ruiz
Guest Appearances: Colombian singer Maluma, singer and Winner of Va Por Ti Yazaira and Miss Universe 2014, Paulina Vega
Guest Teachers: Mexican Actor, Arturo Peniche (Acting) and Laura Moro, (Diction)

Season 9, Episode 5: El Extraño Retorno de Maribel De Santiago
Original Air Date—15 February 2015
Maribel de Santiago returns, older sister of nominee Anayeli De Santiago. One contestant is eliminated and two new nominees are chosen. 
Maribel de Santiago, who auditioned in 2011 in all audition cities and made it to the Top 8, came to support her sister. Anayeli was the first eliminated from the ninth season of Nuestra Belleza Latina getting 48 percent of the vote. Nathalia Casco received 52 percent of the vote and a week left in the competition.
The contestants were asked to model couture costumes, accompanied by salsa artist Gilberto Santa Rosa. Mexican singer and composer El Dasa also shared with the contestants chocolates for Valentine's Day.
Lisandra, Cuban apologized to teammates for misunderstandings. There was a tie between the contestants to save one, and was left to the judges. Clarissa Molina who represents Dominican Republic was again saved by Osmel. Sentenced this week were Geisha Montes De Oca and Nadyalee Torres.
Chica People of the Week: Catherine Castro
Nominees of previous Week: Nathalia Casco and Anayeli De Santiago
Eliminated from the competition: Anayeli De Santiago
Nominated by Judges: Anayeli De Santiago, Geisha Montes De Oca, Nadyalee Torres and Clarissa Molina
Saved by Judges: Clarissa Molina
Nominees of the Week: Nadyalee Torres and Geisha Montes De Oca 
First Call-Out (At the Final Runway): Catherine Castro
Challenge Winners: Lisandra Silva and Clarissa Molina
Guest Appearances: Argentinean Actor, Marcelo Córdoba; Mexican Model and Actor Brandon Peniche; Mexican Singer El Dasa and Puerto Rican singer Gilberto Santa Rosa
Guest Teachers: Mexican Telenovela Director Hector "El Oso" Marquez (Acting)

Season 9, Episode 6: "Cereal" Tension in the Mansion 
Original Air Date—22 February 2015
One contestant was eliminated as two new ones were nominated: Catherine Castro, and representing Central America, Nathalia Casco. The only one who was in favor of Nathalia was Geisha, who later had to be hospitalised for an infection in his leg. Nadyalee Torres was removed from the night with 43 percent of the vote, while Geisha remained one more week to get 57 percent of the vote. In this gala, the girls saved Catherine. However, sentenced this week were Geisha and Gloricely. This week the contestants had to do a live challenge delivering lines from a teleprompter with exotic animals in their surroundings. Catherine Castro failed the entire challenge. Actress Aislinn Derbez taught the contestants acting skills and challenged them, and the winner of this challenge was Cynthia Perez who will be able to attend the premier of Derbez's new film "A la Mala" in Mexico City. Chiquis Rivera was on stage along with Plan B and Wisin as the musical entertainment for the week. Ending with an encouraging message from Becky G and the girls cat-walking her single "Shower."
Chica People of the Week: Catherine Castro
Nominees of previous Week: Nadyalee Torres and Geisha Montes De Oca 
Eliminated from the competition: Nadyalee Torres
Nominated by Judges: Geisha Montes De Oca, Catherine Castro and Gloricely Loug
Saved by Fellow Contestants: Catherine Castro
Nominees of the Week: Geisha Montes De Oca and Gloricely Loug
First Call-Out (At the Final Runway): Nathalia Casco
Challenge Winner: Cynthia Perez
Guest Appearances: Puerto Rican singer Wisin; TV personality/Singer Chiquis and daughter of the late Jenni Rivera; American Singer Becky G
Guest Teachers: Mexican actress Aislinn Derbez and daughter of comedian Eugenio Derbez (Acting)

Season 9, Episode 7: Dirty Little Truths 
Original Air Date—1 March 2015
The night began with a song from Mexican artist Thalia who was there to launch her new clothing line sold in Macy's. She was also the judge for the challenge of the week, where the contestant must choose a garment from the clothing collection, catwalk and talk about why they chose the garment. Francisca won the challenge and took $10,000 as prize to spend on the department store that carries Thalia's clothing line. Clarissa was saved, and Osmel warned that everyone would be tested for nicotine, with contestants testing positive automatically removed from the competition. With 74 percent against her Gloricely left the competition. Nathalia, Bridget and Clarissa saved Clarissa by unanimous vote, leaving between Nathalia and Bridget the vote to see who stays and who goes next week.

Chica People of the Week: Nathalia Casco
Nominees of previous Week: Geisha Montes De Oca and Gloricely Loug 
Eliminated from the competition: Gloricely Loug
Nominated by Judges: Nathalia Casco, Bridget Ruiz and Clarissa Molina
Saved by Fellow Contestants: Clarissa Molina
Nominees of the Week: Nathalia Casco and Bridget Ruiz
First Call-Out (At the Final Runway): Mariana Torres
Challenge Winner: Francisca Lachapel
Guest Appearances: Mexican Singer & ActressThalía, Puerto Rican Singer Elvis Crespo
Guest Teachers: Mexican Singer & ActressThalía (Presenter/Runway)
Zip-line Challenge

Season 9, Episode 8: New Heights 
Original Air Date—8 March 2015
The results of nicotine testing were negative. Lisandra collapsed when Osmel told her she was a disappointment. Catherine did not do well in the weekly challenge. Bridget Ruiz was the fourth eliminated, while Nathalia stayed one more week with 72 percent of the vote. The three nominees were Cynthia, Lisandra and Catherine but the girls saved Cynthia. Sentenced this week were Catherine and Lisandra. For the upcoming week two contestants will be sent home with one automatic elimination coming from Osmel Sousa. 
Chica People of the Week: Mariana Torres
Nominees of previous Week: Nathalia Casco and Bridget Ruiz
Eliminated from the competition: Bridget Ruiz
Nominated by Judges: Cynthia Perez, Catherine Castro and Lisandra Silva
Saved by Fellow Contestants: Cynthia Perez
Nominees of the Week: Catherine Castro and Lisandra Silva
First Call-Out (At the Final Runway): Geisha Montes De Oca
Challenge Winner: Clarissa Molina and Mariana Torres 
Guest Appearances:Music Group Gente de Zona, Mexican-American Singer Luis Coronel
Guest Teachers: Venezuelan Actor/Fitness Guru Alejandro Chaban (Nutrition) and People en Español magazine editor Armando Correa (Beauty Challenge)

Season 9, Episode 9: Dancing With the "Beauty" Stars 
Original Air Date—15 March 2015
A seventh gala where two contestants are eliminated: Lisandra from Cuba and Cynthia from Mexico. Lisandra was knocked out of the competition with 63% of the votes against her. The judges gave their vote of confidence in Nathalia, eliminating Cynthia due to remarks she made and what they called her lack of confidence. The contestants perform dance challenges. Mane de la Parra, Yul Burke, Mauricio Mejia Borja, Melvin Cabrera, Fernando Corona and Tony Andrade accompanied each of the contestnatsx with different choreography. Francisca and Mariana were praised for their performance, and Nathalia, Cynthia and Geisha were criticized for the lack of commitment. Marco Antonio Solis accompanied them as they paraded in couture dresses, Roberto Tapia started the gala and Chino y Nacho judged the swimsuit parade. This week there were no nominees as the finals are in a few weeks.

Part One:
Chica People of the Week: Nathalia Casco
Nominees of previous Week: Catherine Castro and Lisandra Silva
Eliminated from the competition: Lisandra Silva
First Call-Out (Safe): Mariana Torres
Challenge Winner: Francisca Lachapel
Guest Appearances:  Mexican-American Singer Roberto Tapia

Part Two:
Automatically Nominated by Judges: Nathalia Casco and Cynthia Perez
Eliminated by Judges: Cynthia Perez
First Call-Out (At the Final Runway): Clarissa Molina
Guest Appearances: Venezuelan Pop Duo Chino & Nacho, Puerto Rican reggaeton singer-songwriter Farruko, and Mexicano Musician & Composer Marco Antonio Solís 
Guest Dancers: Mexican Singer & Actor Mané de la Parra, Dominican Republic Reporter & Anchor Tony Dandrades, Mexican Actor Mauricio Mejia, Model/Actor Salvador Corpas, Venezuelan Actor Yul Bürkle, Spaniard Social Media Reporter Borja Voces, Venezuelan Actor Melvin Cabrera, Mexican Singer and Runner-Up of "Va Por Ti" Fernando Corona

Dance Partners:

Season 9, Episode 10: Drama is the New Black 
Original Air Date—22 March 2015
Larry Hernandez accompanied the candidates to a beauty pageant, along with former "Sin Banderas" Noel. Lissandra talked to the contestants after their expulsion last week. This Sunday the candidates were subjected to two different tests: one answers of general interest accompanied with "Bellecitas" girls contest "Despierta America". The other task was to try to get out of a "prison" where they encountered scares in their paths. Each girl received a box full of memories sent by their families. Mariana received the news that her grandfather was not in good health, and Clarissa talked about her parents' separation. When the judges choose the three candidates to be removed, they named Catherine, Geisha and Natalia, who saved Catherine prior to the semi-finals.

Chica People of the Week: Nathalia Casco
Nominated by Judges: Catherine Castro, Geisha Montes De Oca and Nathalia Casco
Saved by Fellow Contestants:Catherine Castro 
Nominees of the Week: Geisha Montes De Oca and Nathalia Casco
First Call-Out (At the Final Runway): Mariana Torres
Challenge Winner: Clarissa Molina
Guest Appearances: Reginal Mexicano Singer Larry Hernandez, Argentinean Singer-Songwriter Noel Schajris, and Cuban-American Orange Is the New Black actress Selenis Leyva, Cuban-American Salsa Singer Joe Rodriguez, ¡Despierta América! Bellecitas Latinas
Guest Teachers: Physical Trainer & Former Republica Deportiva model Claudia Molina (Fitness)

Season 9, Episode 11: Road to the Semi-Finals
Original Air Date—29 March 2015
Chica People of the Week: Nathalia Casco 
Nominees of previous Week: Nathalia Casco and Geisha Montes De Oca 
Eliminated from the competition: Geisha Montes De Oca 
Nominated by Fellow Contestants: Nathalia Casco and Catherine Castro
Saved by Judges: Catherine Castro
Nominated by Judges: Mariana Torres
Nominees of the Week: Nathalia Casco and Mariana Torres
First Call-Out (At the Final Runway): Clarissa Molina
Challenge Winner: Catherine Castro
Guest Appearances: Singer-Songwriter Nicky Jam, TV Host and Personality Carlos Calderon, Actor and Acting Coach Sebastián Ligarde
Guest Teachers: The Fast and the Furious franchise actress Jordana Brewster (Acting & Stunts); Movie Double Stunt Coordinator Juan Bofill (High Risk Stunts), Siempre Mujer editor Christina Marrero, Maybelline New York beauty expert Delvin González

Season 9, Episode 12: The Final Chopping Block 
Original Air Date—4 April 2015
Chica People of the Week: Nathalia Casco 
Nominees of previous Week: Nathalia Casco and Mariana Torres
Eliminated from the Competition: Mariana Torres
Brought Back: Lisandra Silva (April Fool's Guest)
2015 Semi-Finalists: Clarissa Molina, Catherine Castro, Francisca Lachapel and Nathalia Casco
First Call-Out (At the Final Runway): Francisca Lachapel
Challenge Winner: Clarissa Molina (Colgate) and Catherine Castro (Facebook)
Guest Appearances: Colombian reggaeton singer J Balvin, Mexican Banda Group La Arrolladora Banda El Limón and Model-Singer Christian Daniel, Mexican Singer-Songwriter Alejandra Guzmán

Season 9, Episode 13: Nuestra Belleza Latina 2015 is... 
Original Air Date—12 April 2015
After 13 weeks of competition, the Dominican Francisca Lachapel became the new winner of Nuestra Belleza Latina, with the majority of votes and approval of judges. A final gala was held, with guest appearances from Paulina Rubio, Ricky Martin, Prince Royce, Antony Santos, Espinoza Paz and J Alvarez. With her character "Mela La Melaza," Lachapel emerged as winner from the auditions, winning $200,000 in prizes, a contract with Univision, a new Kia Soul car, and inclusion in the list of "50 Most Beautiful" by People magazine in Spanish. Honduran Nathalia Casco was awarded first runner-up. Puerto Rican Catherine Castro was second runner-up, and won a scholarship from CEA Televisa in Mexico to study acting. In fourth place was Clarissa Molina.
Chica People of the Week: Nathalia Casco
CEA Scholarship Winner: Catherine Castro
Predecessor: Aleyda Ortiz, Nuestra Belleza Latina 2014
Guest Appearances: Mexican Model & Actor Eduardo Verástegui, Main Cast of ¡Despierta América! Alan Tacher, Anchor and Moderator for Sal y Pimienta Lourdes Stephen, Singer-Songwriter Prince Royce, Bachata Singer-Songwriter Antony Santos, Musician Singer-Songwriter Espinoza Paz, Pop Singer Paulina Rubio, Puerto Rican Reggaetón artist J Alvarez and La Banda Producer Singer-Songwriter Ricky Martin
2015 Finalists: Clarissa Molina, Catherine Castro, Francisca Lachapel and Nathalia Casco
4th Place: Clarissa Molina
3rd Place: Catherine Castro
Runner-Up: Nathalia Casco
Nuestra Belleza Latina 2015: Francisca Lachapel

2015 Contestants

Summaries

Call-out order

Winners

References

External links
 Nuestra Belleza Latina at Univision.com 
 
 https://web.archive.org/web/20100317141801/http://foro.univision.com/univision/board?board.id=bellezalatina
 http://video.aol.fr/video-detail/nuestra-belleza-latina-2010/784361480/?icid=VIDURV12
 http://network.nshp.org/events/nuestra-belleza-latina-2010-1
 https://web.archive.org/web/20110218104928/http://mipagina.univision.com/nuestrabelleza
 http://foro.univision.com/t5/Nuestra-Belleza-Latina/MIREN-NUESTRA-BELLEZA-LATINA-2011/m-p/389909861
 http://latino.foxnews.com/latino/news/2014/01/14/univision-signs-alicia-machado-for-nuestra-belleza-latina/

Univision original programming
2015 beauty pageants
Nuestra Belleza Latina